Ban Mi is a district (amphoe) in the western part of Lopburi province, central Thailand.

History
The district was created in 1883, then named Sanam Chaeng. When the district office was moved to Ban Huai Kaeo, the district name was changed to Huai Kaeo as well. When in 1898 the Thai government built the Northern Railway through the district, the district center was moved to Ban Sao (Thai บ้านเซ่า) and the district name was changed back to Sanam Chaeng. In 1917 it was renamed Ban Sao as the name of the tambon of the district center. Finally the Thai government changed the name to Ban Mi in 1939.

The name Ban Mi is the name of an old town of Phuan people who migrated from Laos to Siam around 1870. The name originates from a hand weaving method to weave cotton or silk fabric, named Mat Mi (มัดหมี่) in Thai.

Geography
Neighboring districts are (from the northeast clockwise) Nong Muang, Khok Samrong, Mueang Lop Buri, Tha Wung of Lopburi, In Buri of Singburi province, and Takhli of Nakhon Sawan province.

The water resources of Ban Mi are the Bang Kham River and Khlong Anusasanan.

Administration

Central administration 
Ban Mi is divided into 22 sub-districts (tambons), which are further subdivided into 157 administrative villages (mubans).

Local administration 
There is one town (thesaban mueang) in the district:
 Ban Mi consisting of the sub-district Ban Mi.

There are 20 subdistrict administrative organizations (SAO) in the district:
 Phai Yai consisting of sub-district Phai Yai.
 Ban Sai consisting of sub-district Ban Sai.
 Ban Kluai consisting of sub-district Ban Kluai.
 Ban Chi consisting of sub-district Ban Chi.
 Phu Kha consisting of sub-district Phu Kha.
 Hin Pak consisting of sub-district Hin Pak.
 Bang Phueng consisting of sub-district Bang Phueng.
 Nong Sai Khao consisting of sub-district Nong Sai Khao.
 Bang Kaphi Dong Phlap consisting of sub-districts Bang Kaphi and Dong Phlap.
 Nong Tao consisting of sub-district Nong Tao.
 Phon Thong consisting of sub-district Phon Thong.
 Bang Kham consisting of sub-district Bang Kham.
 Don Dueng consisting of sub-district Don Dueng.
 Chon Muang consisting of sub-district Chon Muang.
 Nong Krabian consisting of sub-district Nong Krabian.
 Sai Huai Kaeo consisting of sub-district Sai Huai Kaeo.
 Maha Son consisting of sub-district Maha Son.
 Chiang Nga consisting of sub-district Chiang Nga.
 Nong Mueang consisting of sub-district Nong Mueang.
 Sanam Chaeng consisting of sub-district Sanam Chaeng.

References

Ban Mi